Ahyalosticta is a monotypic moth genus of the family Pyralidae described by Hans Georg Amsel in 1956. Its single species is Ahyalosticta affinialis described in the same publication.

References

Chrysauginae
Monotypic moth genera
Pyralidae genera
Taxa named by Hans Georg Amsel